Miss Major Griffin-Gracy (born October 25, 1940), often referred to as Miss Major, is a trans woman activist and community leader for transgender rights, with a particular focus on women of color. She served as the original Executive Director for the Transgender Gender Variant Intersex Justice Project, which aims to assist transgender persons, who are disproportionately incarcerated under the prison-industrial complex.  Griffin-Gracy has participated in activism for a wide range of causes throughout her lifetime.

Early life
Griffin-Gracy was born in the South Side of Chicago on October 25, 1940, and was assigned male at birth. Griffin-Gracy participated in drag balls during her youth, and described her experience in Chicago in a 1998 interview:

Griffin-Gracy also believed that, at the time, she and her peers were unaware they were questioning the gender they were assigned at birth, and noted that much of the contemporary terminology surrounding gender identities did not exist. Miss Major reported that she came out as a transgender woman in the late 1950s.

As a transgender woman, Griffin-Gracy was met with a lot of criticism and maltreatment from her peers. In a radio interview, she recalls the need for someone to always be by her side in order to avoid situations where her peers could single her out and violently attack her.

Transitioning 
At the start of her medical transition, Griffin-Gracy relied on the black market for her hormones. Over twenty years, she suffered from homelessness and participated in sex work. She also participated in other illegal activities, including theft, in order to support herself.

Family 
Griffin-Gracy has five sons. Christopher was born in 1978. Her three other sons were adopted into her family after meeting them in a California park. The boys were runaways, and had meals together with Griffin-Gracy and her biological son.

In September 2020, Griffin-Gracy announced that she and her partner, LGBTQ+ activist Beck Witt (a trans man himself), were expecting a child together. On 9 January 2021, Beck & Miss Major welcomed their son Asiah Wittenstein Major into the world.

Activism

New York City
At some point Griffin-Gracy moved from Chicago to New York City.  While some organizations, including gay bars in the city, would deny entry to trans women, she established herself within the New York LGBT community.

She had a five-year sentence at Clinton Correctional Facility in Dannemora for a burglary conviction where she met Frank "Big Black" Smith who had participated in the Attica Correctional Facility riots of 1971. The two of them communicated regularly during her time there. She says he showed her great respect despite her gender identity, and that he talked her through the information that she needed to really help her community—to fix a problem rather than mask it. She was released from Dannemora in 1974 with new hope for her community.

California
Griffin-Gracy moved to San Diego in 1978 and organized community efforts and grassroots movements.  She initially started with work at a local food bank and later provided direct services for trans women who were incarcerated, suffering from addiction, or homeless.  While in San Diego, the AIDS epidemic struck the United States, and as a part of her service, Griffin-Gracy found herself providing additional healthcare and multiple funerals each week.  Griffin-Gracy then moved to the San Francisco Bay Area in the mid 1990s where she served on multiple HIV/AIDS organizations including the Tenderloin AIDS Resource Center.

In 2003, Griffin-Gracy began working at the Transgender Gender Variant Intersex Justice Project (TGIJP) shortly after it was founded by Alex Lee, although sometimes she is credited as the founder.  She served as the Executive Director of the project, leading efforts to support transgender women who have been imprisoned, particularly women of color. Both within her organization and without, she has fought against criminalization and police brutality. She is credited for leading direct service efforts and personalized care to incarcerated trans women of color with TGIJP in addition to her leadership in previous organizations.

In February 2008, she and Melenie Eleneke addressed the UN Committee on the Elimination of Racial Discrimination in Geneva, Switzerland on the lack of economic opportunity for transgender women of color in the United States.

Beginning in the 2010's, Griffin-Gracy gave a number of interviews stating that she was a leader of the Stonewall riots, that the Stonewall Inn was a haven for transgender women, and that the riots were predominantly made up of transgender women; Griffin-Gracy also stated that well-known activists like Marsha P. Johnson, who many witnesses place at the riots, and gay men who were photographed at the riots, had not been present.

General views
Griffin-Gracy views the state of being transgender or genderqueer as one of "living outside the law" due to constant rejection from mainstream audiences, particularly in pursuing job or education opportunities. She also argues that while many people with transgender and queer identities are not imprisoned, their identities and means of expression are policed through social behavior and state policies. She frequently cites the prison industrial complex as a major factor in why transgender people are incarcerated, specifically people of color and those with low income.

Griffin-Gracy has discussed the need for activism for transgender persons based in part on stories of discrimination from others. She herself began her journey as a trans activist after being made aware of how many young trans women were being murdered with no response from the world around them. In the 1970s, a friend named Puppy, a Puerto Rican trans woman and sex worker, was found dead in her own apartment. Griffin-Gracy held that there was evidence of a murder, but authorities ruled her friend's death a suicide. Griffin-Gracy described the event and its impact on her in an interview:

This outlook has fueled much of her activism to date.

Griffin-Gracy has frequently criticized the LGBT movement based on its exclusion of transgender persons from participation and positions of leadership, particularly trans people of color, those with low income, and those who have been previously imprisoned.

Feminism 
Griffin-Gracy is a self-proclaimed feminist. Her view of feminism is a woman's ability to be both strong and delicate at the same time. She made the decision to identify as a feminist when people began questioning her as a parent.

She has noted that her favorite aspect of activist work is the education and hope that it provides to the women in her community. She wishes for the simplest human rights for trans youth, saying:

I'd like for the girls to get a chance to be who they are. For young transgender people to go to school, learn like everyone else does, and then get out there and live their lives, not afraid or thinking that the only solution for them is death.

In addition to her focus on basic human rights, Miss Major advocates for radical change in her community. She strives to bring attention to the intersectionality of poverty, race, and gender in situations related to incarceration, employment, and mental and physical health. She draws inspiration for her activism from Elizabeth Taylor and Angela Davis.

Documentary
A documentary titled Major! was released in 2015 and portrays Griffin-Gracy's role as an activist and mentor in the transgender community since the 1960s. She describes the film as not only a tool to present to young trans women their history, but as a reminder for herself that young women still need her help.

References

1940 births
Activists from Illinois
African-American feminists
American feminists
American transgender people
LGBT African Americans
LGBT feminists
LGBT people from Illinois
American LGBT rights activists
Living people
People from Chicago
Prison reformers
Transfeminists
Transgender women
Transgender rights activists